Jason Fife (born January 23, 1981) is a former American football quarterback. He was originally signed as a free agent by the Detroit Lions in 2004. He played college football at Oregon.

College career
Fife played college football at the University of Oregon, backing up Joey Harrington until Harrington left for the 2002 NFL Draft and Fife became the starter. In 2002 Fife was ranked the #2 QB in the nation.

On September 20, 2003, Fife, sharing QB duties with Kellen Clemens, helped lead the 22nd-ranked Ducks in an upset of the then-third-ranked Michigan Wolverines. Fife's second-quarter 15-yard touchdown run became the cover of Sports Illustrated in the September 29th issue.

Professional career
Fife was not drafted in the 2004 NFL draft.  He signed with the Detroit Lions as a free agent, but was cut from the team during training camp.

Fife was on the practice squad for the New Orleans Saints from 2006-2007.  In December 2007, he joined the Washington Redskins' practice squad.

Fife also played for a time in the Arena Football League for the Las Vegas Gladiators, and in 2008 with the Dallas Desperados.

Coaching
Fife has also coached in various positions for different high school programs.  Most recently, he was an assistant coach for the Sheldon High School football team in Eugene, Oregon.

Personal life
Jason is married, and has 4 children, all of which are named after comic book characters. He is now a dentist in Oregon.

References

External links
Arena Football bio
Washington Redskins' bio
Dallas Desperados' bio
NYTimes article

1981 births
American football quarterbacks
Dallas Desperados players
Detroit Lions players
Las Vegas Gladiators players
Living people
Minnesota Vikings players
New Orleans Saints players
Oregon Ducks football players
Sportspeople from San Bernardino, California
Rhein Fire players
Washington Redskins players